Frank Blake was a college football coach at Gordon Institute and Mercer. He was a graduate of Vanderbilt University, the brother of Bob Blake and Dan Blake.

References

Mercer Bears football coaches
Vanderbilt Commodores athletes